Gilbert Dahan is a French historian of religions, director of research at the CNRS and at the École pratique des hautes études. He is notably a recognized medievalist. His work has renewed studies on the exegesis of the Bible in the Christian West during the Middle Ages.

He is also a specialist of 's work.

Selected publications 
1990: Les Intellectuels chrétiens et les Juifs au Moyen Âge, Éditions du Cerf, 648 p.
1991: La polémique chrétienne contre le judaïsme au Moyen Âge, Albin Michel, 148 p.
1998: La rhétorique d'Aristote: traditions et commentaires de l'Antiquité aux XIIe siècle (under the direction of G. Dahan and I. Rosier-Catach), Vrin, 360 p.
1999: L’Exégèse chrétienne de la Bible en Occident médiéval, XIIe–XIVe siècles, Cerf, 490 p.
 Le brûlement du Talmud à Paris 1242 - 1244 (under the direction of Gilbert Dahan), Cerf, Paris, 
2000: Les Mages et les bergers (en collaboration), Cerf 128 p.
2001: L'Occident médiéval, lecteur de l'Écriture, Cerf, 100 p. 			
2004: L'Expulsion des Juifs de France (1394) - under the direction of Gilbert Dahan, Cerf, 272 p.
2009: Lire la Bible au Moyen Âge - Essais d'herméneutique médiévale, Droz, Geneva 448 p.
2012 L’Épître de Jacques dans sa tradition d'exégèse, Cerf, 162 p.

References

See also 
History of the Jews in France

External links 
 Recension de l'ouvrage Les Intellectuels chrétiens et les Juifs au Moyen Âge by Dominique Poirel on the site Persée
 « L'exégèse monastique au Moyen Âge », lecture by Gilbert Dahan at the Institut Rachi, 2011		
 « Exégèses juive et chrétienne au Moyen Âge », lecture by Gilbert Dahan on the site Akadem

20th-century French historians
21st-century French historians
French historians of religion
French medievalists
Historians of Jews and Judaism
Academic staff of the École pratique des hautes études
20th-century births
Living people
Year of birth missing (living people)
Research directors of the French National Centre for Scientific Research